Morgan County Airport  is a county-owned, public-use airport in Morgan County, Utah, United States. It is located eight nautical miles (9 mi, 15 km) northwest of the central business district of Morgan.

Facilities and aircraft 
Morgan County Airport covers an area of 28 acres (11 ha) at an elevation of 5,020 feet (1,530 m) above mean sea level. It has one runway designated 3/21 with an asphalt surface measuring 3,904 by 50 feet (1,190 x 15 m).

For the 12-month period ending December 31, 2010, the airport had 13,258 aircraft operations, an average of 36 per day: 99.8% general aviation and 0.2% air taxi. At that time there were 78 aircraft based at this airport: 69% single-engine, 24% glider, 3% multi-engine, 3% ultralight, and 1% helicopter.

References

External links 
 Morgan County Airport (U42) at Utah Soaring Association
 Aerial image as of October 1997 from USGS The National Map
 

Airports in Utah
Transportation in Morgan County, Utah